The Chiostro del Bramante (Cloisters of Bramante) is an Italian Renaissance building in Rome, commissioned by Cardinal Oliviero Carafa in around 1500, and designed by the architect Donato Bramante.

Today the building serves as a space for exhibitions, meetings and concerts. A cafe and bookshop are housed within the building. A fresco painting by Raphael, The Sibyls in the next-door church of Santa Maria della Pace, is visible from the first floor.

References

Renaissance architecture in Rome